Andrea Vaturi (born 24 September 1982) is an Italian former ice dancer. With Alessia Aureli, he won three medals on the ISU Junior Grand Prix series and finished in the top ten at the 2002 and 2003 World Junior Championships.

Career 
Vaturi competed with Lidia Lewandoski for ten years, culminating in a 21st-place finish at the 2001 World Junior Championships.

From 2001 through 2006, he competed with Alessia Aureli. They are the 2004 and 2005 Italian silver medalists and 2006 bronze medalists.

Personal life 
In 2004, Vaturi graduated from Bocconi University with a degree in management, and completed a Master of Science from the same university in 2007.

His son, Massimo, was born in 2012. His younger brother Simone Vaturi is also an ice dancer.

Programs

With Aureli

With Lewandoski

Results

With Aureli

With Lewandoski

References 

Sources
 
 

Italian male ice dancers
Figure skaters from Milan
1982 births
Living people